JFK Airport station may refer to:

New York City Subway 
 Howard Beach–JFK Airport station
 Sutphin Boulevard–Archer Avenue–JFK Airport station

See also 
 Jamaica station
 JFK Airport